The Sierra de las Minas hidden salamander (Cryptotriton sierraminensis) is one of seven species of salamander in the family Plethodontidae. In 2009, it was the most recent species to be described in Cryptotriton.
It is found in the Sierra de las Minas of eastern Guatemala.
Its natural habitat are cloud forests. It is threatened by habitat loss.

References

Cryptotriton
Endemic fauna of Guatemala
Amphibians of Guatemala
Amphibians described in 2009